Sunday Edition may refer to:

 Sunday Edition (Australian TV program), an Australian morning news television program that debuted on Sky News Live in 2016
 Sunday Edition (Canadian TV series), a 1988–1999 Canadian news and public affairs television program
 The Sunday Edition, a 2006–2007 British political interview and discussion television programme
 The Sunday Edition (CBC Radio), a Canadian news and information radio show
 Sunday editions, weekly newspapers published on Sunday
 Sunday comics, weekly special comics printings in newspapers

See also
 The Sunday Times (disambiguation)
 Sunday (disambiguation)